Indian Hill Site may refer to:

Indian Hill Site (Marquette, Kansas), listed on the National Register of Historic Places in Ellsworth County, Kansas
Indian Hill Site (Royalton, Minnesota), listed on the National Register of Historic Places in Benton County, Minnesota (listing code="DR")
Indian Hill Site (St. Helena Island, South Carolina), listed on the National Register of Historic Places in Beaufort County, South Carolina